Metrobudivnykiv is a station on Dnipro Metro's Tsentralno–Zavodska Line. It is a single-vault deep subway station, accessible by escalator and was opened on 29 December 1995. The station has a total of 3 exits, each of which leads to the corner of Serhiy Nigoyan Avenue and Ivan Mazepa Avenue. The station is named Metrobudivnikiv for the subway builders of the city.

External links

 Dnipro Metropoliten - Metrobudivnykiv Station

Dnipro Metro stations
Railway stations opened in 1995